Westfield Township is one of fifteen townships in Clark County, Illinois, USA.  As of the 2010 census, its population was 720 and it contained 345 housing units.

Geography

Cities, towns, villages
 Westfield

Cemeteries
The township contains these four cemeteries: Conrad Baptist, Good Hope, Maple Hill and Methodist.

Major highways
  Illinois Route 49

Demographics

School districts
 Casey-Westfield Community Unit School District 4c

Political districts
 Illinois' 15th congressional district
 State House District 109
 State Senate District 55

References
 
 United States Census Bureau 2007 TIGER/Line Shapefiles
 United States National Atlas

External links
 City-Data.com
 Illinois State Archives

Townships in Clark County, Illinois
Townships in Illinois